Marcellus Central School District is a school district in Marcellus, New York. It consists of Marcellus High School, C.S. Driver Middle School, and K.C. Heffernan Elementary school. The district was established in 1933.

School districts in New York (state)
School districts established in 1933
Education in Onondaga County, New York
1933 establishments in New York (state)